Santi Marcellino e Pietro may refer to:
 Santi Marcellino e Pietro al Laterano: Catholic church in Rome, a titular church
 Marcellinus and Peter: 4th century Christian martyrs in the city of Rome